Goldstein is a 1964 film co-directed by Philip Kaufman and Benjamin Manaster, and produced by Kaufman and Zev Braun. 
The cast featured a number of actors from The Second City comedy troupe in a retelling of the story of Elijah. It had earned praise by filmmakers Jean Renoir and François Truffaut (the former called it "the best American film I have seen in 20 years").

Accolades
The film shared the Prix de la Nouvelle Critique at the Cannes Film Festival in 1964 with Bertolucci's Before the Revolution.

Cast
Lou Gilbert as Old Man
Ellen Madison as Sally
Tom Erhart as Sculptor
Ben Carruthers as Jay
Charles Fischer as Mr. Nice
Severn Darden as Doctor
Anthony Holland as Aid
Nelson Algren as himself
Jack Burns as Truck Driver / Policeman
Mike Turro as Guard
Viola Spolin
Del Close as Doctor

See also
Improvisational theatre
Martin Buber
Jewish folklore

References

External links

1965 films
Films directed by Philip Kaufman
Films set in Chicago
Films shot in Chicago
1964 comedy films
1964 films
American comedy films
1965 directorial debut films
1965 comedy films
Films about Jews and Judaism
Films based on the Hebrew Bible
Films produced by Zev Braun
1960s English-language films
1960s American films